This page is list of forts and fort ruins in Kosovo.

Harilaq Fortress, in Kosovo Polje Municipality
Zvečan Fortress, in Mitrovica Municipality
Novo Brdo Fortress, in Pristina Municipality
Prilepac, in Pristina Municipality
Prizrenac, in Pristina Municipality
Kaljaja, in Prizren Municipality
Gradište, in Gjilan Municipality
Zatrič, in Orahovac Municipality
Pogragja Castle, Gjilan District
Vojinović Tower, Mitrovica District

See also
 List of forts
 List of forts in Serbia

Forts
 
Forts
Kosovo